Love in the Wilderness is a 1907 novel by the British writer Gertrude Page. It was her debut and breakthrough novel, which she followed with the even more successful Paddy the Next Best Thing the following year. The novel takes place in Rhodesia, which Page had herself emigrated to with her husband several years earlier.

Adaptation
In 1920 it was made into a British silent film of the same title directed by Alexander Butler and starring Madge Titheradge.

References

Bibliography
 Block, Andrew. Key Books of British Authors, 1600-1932. D. Archer, 1933.
 Goble, Alan. The Complete Index to Literary Sources in Film. Walter de Gruyter, 1999.
 John, Juliet. The Oxford Handbook of Victorian Literary Culture. Oxford University Press, 2016.

1907 British novels
Novels by Gertrude Page
British romance novels
British novels adapted into films
Novels set in Rhodesia
Hurst and Blackett books